Cheremshanka (Kalbalu) is a rural locality (a selo) in Souzginskoye Rural Settlement of Mayminsky District, the Altai Republic, Russia. The population was 445 as of 2016. There are 8 streets.

Geography 
Cheremshanka is located on the Katun River, 22 km south of Mayma (the district's administrative centre) by road. Turbaza "Yunost" is the nearest rural locality.

References 

Rural localities in Mayminsky District